On the Edge is a 2001 television film, broadcast on Showtime. It is a anthology film, with each segment directed by an actress with few or no prior directing credits and adapted from an existing science fiction short story. The film was part of the larger Showtime Directed By series.

The film consists of a frame segment, directed by Jana Sue Memel, and three story segments. The first, "Happy Birthday", was directed by Helen Mirren and was based on  The Placement Test  by Keith Laumer. The second segment, "The Other Side", was directed by Mary Stuart Masterson and based on  Lifeboat on a Burning Sea  by Bruce Holland Rogers. The third segment, "Reaching Normal", was directed by Anne Heche and based on  Command Performance  by Walter M. Miller Jr.

Cast

Frame segment 
 Scott Lowell as Charlie
 Jolene Blalock as Charlie's Wife
 Stephen Tobolowsky as Tom
 Kathleen Wilhoite as Lucy

Happy Birthday 
 John Goodman as The Dean
 Sydney Tamiia Poitier as Hannah
 Beverly D'Angelo as Bag Lady
 Christopher Lloyd as Attorney Bum
 David Hyde Pierce as Barney
 Caroline Rhea as Monica
 Jenica Bergere as Sally
 Ken Hudson Campbell as Security Guard
 Roman Danylo as Donald
 Kimiko Gelman as May Lee Ha
 Jean Kasem as Nurse
 Taylor Negron as Policeman
 Travis Wester as Chute Boy
 Dondre Whitfield as Man in Elevator
 Marissa Jaret Winokur as Dean's Secretary
 Helen Mirren as Distinguished Woman

The Other Side 
 Anthony LaPaglia as Dr. Maas/Biobot
 Karen Sillas as Dr. Anna Richardson
 Bruce Davison as Jackson Bierly

Reaching Normal 
 Andie MacDowell as Lisa
 Paul Rudd as Kenneth
 Joey Lauren Adams as Sarah
 Alan Rosenberg as Frank
 Joel Gray as Dr. Mensley
 Ellen DeGeneres as Operator

Reception 
The film generally received negative or mixed reviews. A review in Variety describes it as "Three short films, all debut directing efforts by well-known actresses....Not surprisingly, the collection is uneven and the work a bit rough, particularly so when the actors also write their own scripts, as in the case of Mary Stuart Masterson and Anne Heche." According to the website Fantafilm, the film is an "Interesting, even if not entirely successful, trilogy of the fantastic in which the actresses Masterson, Mirren, and Heche try their hand at directing by proposing a vision of the future with disconcerting and satirical tones."

Promotion 
The tagline is: "Tales that will take you to the edge... if you dare...".

Notes

External links 
 
 

2001 television films
2001 science fiction films
2000s English-language films
American science fiction television films
American anthology films
Films directed by Mary Stuart Masterson
Films directed by Anne Heche
Showtime (TV network) films

it:On the Edge (film 2001)